The 2011 BC Lions season was the 54th season for the team in the Canadian Football League and their 58th overall. The Lions finished in first place in the West Division with an 11–7 record. The Lions won their sixth Grey Cup championship over the Winnipeg Blue Bombers by a score of 34–23. The Lions became the first team in league history to start a season 0–5 and finish in first place. They also became the first team to lose their first five regular season games and win the Grey Cup. The Lions were also the first team to win a Grey Cup championship in their home stadium since the 1994 BC Lions and were only the fourth team to win at home since the inception of the Canadian Football League in 1958. Because of their remarkable season, the Lions were named the Canadian Press Team of the Year for 2011, becoming only the second CFL team to win the award since 1983.

The Lions opened their training camp at Hillside Stadium in Kamloops, British Columbia with rookie camp beginning June 1 and main camp beginning on June 5. Due to ongoing construction at BC Place Stadium, the Lions played their first five regular season games at Empire Field before moving to BC Place for the remaining four. On October 10, 2011, the Lions clinched a playoff berth after the Saskatchewan Roughriders lost their game to the Edmonton Eskimos. This extends the franchise record to 15 straight years in the playoffs, with that mark also tied for fourth-best in CFL history.

Offseason

BC Place construction
Due to the continued construction of BC Place Stadium, the Lions started their season at Empire Field, the temporary stadium that they played in for all ten games in 2010. However, it was unclear as to when the Lions would move into the refurbished stadium, as the contractor, PCL Westcoast Constructor, would not reveal a date. It was likely that between three and five regular season games would be played at BC Place Stadium and it has been guaranteed that it will be complete by November 1, in time for the 99th Grey Cup, which it is scheduled to host.

On February 7, 2011, it was announced that the BC Lions would be opening the newly renovated BC Place on September 30, 2011. When the schedule was released on February 18, 2011, it was announced that the Lions' opponent would be the Edmonton Eskimos and that they would play four 2011 regular season games in BC Place Stadium.

CFL draft
The 2011 CFL Draft took place on Sunday, May 8, 2011. The Lions had five selections in the draft, with the first coming in the sixth spot overall, after trading their third overall pick with Calgary. Through the trade, BC was still able to select their first choice, Marco Iannuzzi, with their first pick and then draft kicker/punter Hugh O'Neill to replace the recently traded Sean Whyte. BC also selected Alex Ellis in the 2011 supplemental draft, and must forfeit a sixth-round 2012 draft pick.

Preseason

 Games played with white uniforms.

Regular season

Standings

Season schedule
 The Lions played their first five regular season games at Empire Field and played their remaining four at BC Place Stadium.

 Games played with colour uniforms.
 Games played with white uniforms.
 Games played with alternate uniforms.

Roster

Coaching staff

Player stats

Passing

Rushing

Receiving

Awards and records
CFL's Most Outstanding Player Award – Travis Lulay, QB
John Agro Special Teams Award – Paul McCallum, K/P

2011 CFL All-Stars
QB – Travis Lulay, CFL All-Star
WR – Geroy Simon, CFL All-Star
OT – Jovan Olafioye, CFL All-Star
OC – Angus Reid, CFL All-Star
DT – Aaron Hunt, CFL All-Star
DT – Khalif Mitchell, CFL All-Star
LB – Solomon Elimimian, CFL All-Star
DB – Korey Banks, CFL All-Star
K – Paul McCallum, CFL All-Star

Western All-Stars
QB – Travis Lulay, Western All-Star
WR – Geroy Simon, Western All-Star
OT – Ben Archibald, Western All-Star
OT – Jovan Olafioye, Western All-Star
OC – Angus Reid, Western All-Star
DT – Aaron Hunt, Western All-Star
DT – Khalif Mitchell, Western All-Star
DE – Keron Williams, Western All-Star
LB – Solomon Elimimian, Western All-Star
CB – Dante Marsh, Western All-Star
DB – Korey Banks, Western All-Star
K – Paul McCallum, Western All-Star

Milestones
On September 10, 2011, Lions receiver Geroy Simon became the franchise's all-time touchdowns leader when he scored his 88th touchdown as a BC Lion, surpassing Willie Fleming.

Playoffs

Schedule

 Games played with colour uniforms.

Bracket

*-Team won in Overtime.

West Final

Grey Cup

References

External links
2011 BC Lions season at Official Site
2011 BC Lions season at CFL.ca

BC Lions seasons
BC Lions
Grey Cup championship seasons
2011 in British Columbia